Discovery, Maryland may refer to the following places in Maryland:
Discovery, Frederick County, Maryland, an unincorporated community
Discovery, St. Mary's County, Maryland, an unincorporated community
Discovery-Spring Garden, Maryland, a former census-designated place in Frederick County